130 mood : TRBL is the debut extended play by South Korean singer Dean. It was released by Joombas and Universal Music Group on March 24, 2016.

Background and release
On March 21, Dean released a music video for "Bonnie & Clyde", the first track from 130 Mood : TRBL, in which he plays the role of Clyde in a reenactment of Bonnie and Clyde. On March 23, a music video for another track, "D (Half Moon)" featuring Gaeko was released and a showcase was held in Gangnam, Seoul. The seven-track EP was released the following day, its title named after the racing number '130', which James Dean had painted on his car, and which embodies the same experimental spirit he feels about music. The 'TRBL' portion of the title is a stylisation of 'trouble'. The album is intended to narrate a love story through its consecutive tracks and was written and produced by Dean along with collaborators, with several of the tracks previously released as singles.

Critical reception

Billboard K-Town columnist Jeff Benjamin described the chart position on the Heatseekers Albums chart uncommon for a K-pop act, and especially for a debut release. He said that the album was an "impressive debut creatively that pushes R&B ahead into the future with its compositions and collaborations – notably the woozy "Pour Up" featuring Zico of Block B, the Weeknd-recalling "21" and "What 2 Do" with Korean R&B star Crush and L.A. singer Jeff Bernat." The album was picked number 5, as one of the 10 Best K-Pop Albums of 2016 by Billboard. The Star gave the album 8 stars out of 10, and praised the album, saying it "soothes and tantalises", and is an "impressive debut album." Bandwagon gave the album a positive review, "His songwriting in 130 Mood: TRBL shows. His future R&B production is top-class, and his ability to write memorable hooks and sultry, resonant melodies is on full display through the short seven-track record." IZM praised Dean's vocals and melody of the album, especially the track "21", noticing that his talent reaches its peak on that track.

Commercial performance
The EP charted at No. 10 on the Gaon Album Chart, No. 3 on the Billboard World Albums chart, and No. 22 on the Billboard Heatseekers Albums chart, while "Bonnie & Clyde" entered Billboard's World Digital Songs chart at No. 12.

Track listing

Charts and sales

Weekly charts

Sales

Awards

Release history

References

External links 
 "Pour Up" Music Video
 "what2do" Music Video
 "bonnie & clyde" Music Video
 "D (half moon)" Music Video

Korean-language EPs
2016 debut EPs
Dean (South Korean singer) EPs